CGY may refer to:

 Calgary, Alberta, Canada 
 Laguindingan Airport, serving Cagayan de Oro, Mindanao, Philippines, IATA airport code CGY
 Changanasseri railway station, in Kottayam District, Kerala, India, station code CGY
 Centigray (cGy), a derived unit of ionizing radiation dose 
 Calian, a Canadian company traded on the Toronto Stock Exchange